Daniel Chidiac is a writer from Melbourne, Australia. He is the author of Who Says You Can’t? You Do, which was published in 2012.

Career 
Chidiac has written books on wellness, personal growth, philosophy and self-help categories. He has coached contestants on Dancing with the Stars, radio show hosts, DJ's, TV presenters and businesspeople. In July 2021, BBC Radio London hosted a talk show with Chidiac on the topic relationships and heartbreak.

His books include:
 2015 - Awaken Your Mind Open Your Heart - The Steps to Success, Wealth and Happiness 
 2018 - Who Says You Can't? You Do 
 2019 - The Modern Break-Up

References 

21st-century English non-fiction writers
Year of birth missing (living people)